Timofey Reznikov (born July 14, 1981) is a Russian-born Belgian music producer, composer, sound designer,  mixing engineer and mastering engineer from Brussels. Reznikov is best known for his music production and mixing work for David Guetta, as well as for Regi, Dimitri Vegas & Like Mike, among others. In 2022, he was nominated for the 65th Annual Grammy Awards' Best Dance/Electronic Recording category for his production work on the David Guetta single "I'm Good (Blue)", featuring Bebe Rexha.

Early life 
Reznikov was born on 14 July 1981 in Saratov, Soviet Russia. His mother was a violinist in an orchestra and his father taught contrabass at a conservatoire. He initially studied jazz trumpet before enrolling aged 20 at the Conservatoire Royal de Mons in Belgium to study piano and electro-acoustic music.

Career 
In 2018, Reznikov spent two months at Serenity Studios, working with French DJ and producer David Guetta on his seventh studio album. Reznikov gained a production credit on the single "Don't Leave Me Alone" (featuring Anne-Marie) and additionally co-wrote and co-produced several songs on disc two of the album, known as the Jack Back project. Following this, Reznikov went on to collaborate with several artists, most notably Belgian DJ Regi, with whom he was involved in the production of the single "Kom Wat Dichterbij". Reznikov also co-produced Guetta's 2019 single "Stay (Don't Go Away)" featuring Raye and recently produced, mixed and mastered Guetta's single, "I'm Good (Blue)" featuring Bebe Rexha.

Awards and nominations

Grammy Awards 

!
|-
| rowspan="2" |2023
| rowspan="2" |"I'm Good (Blue)" (with Bebe Rexha) (as producer)
| Best Dance/Electronic Recording
|
|rowspan="19"|

Discography

References 

1981 births
Living people
Russian emigrants to Belgium
Musicians from Saratov
Musicians from Brussels
Russian record producers
Belgian record producers